San Isidro, officially the Municipality of San Isidro, is a 5th class municipality in the province of Isabela, Philippines. According to the 2020 census, it has a population of 27,044 people.

Geography

Barangays
San Isidro is politically subdivided into 13 barangays. These barangays are headed by elected officials: Barangay Captain, Barangay Council, whose members are called Barangay Councilors. All are elected every three years.
 Camarag
 Cebu
 Doña Paulina
 Gomez (Poblacion)
 Gud
 Nagbukel
 Patanad
 Quezon
 Ramos East
 Ramos West
 Rizal East
 Rizal West
 Villaflor

Climate

Demographics

Economy

Government

Local government
The municipality is governed by a mayor designated as its local chief executive and by a municipal council as its legislative body in accordance with the Local Government Code. The mayor, vice mayor, and the councilors are elected directly by the people through an election which is being held every three years.

Elected officials

Congress representation
San Isidro, belonging to the sixth legislative district of the province of Isabela, currently represented by Hon. Faustino A. Dy V.

Education
The Schools Division of Isabela governs the town's public education system. The division office is a field office of the DepEd in Cagayan Valley region. The office governs the public and private elementary and public and private high schools throughout the municipality.

References

External links
 Municipal Profile at the National Competitiveness Council of the Philippines
San Isidro at the Isabela Government Website
Local Governance Performance Management System
[ Philippine Standard Geographic Code]
Philippine Census Information

Municipalities of Isabela (province)